Younghusband may refer to:

 Younghusband (band), an English alternative rock band, formed in 2007

People 
 Andrew Younghusband (born 1970), Canadian television personality, writer and journalist
 Arthur Younghusband (1854–1931), English civil servant in India, cousin of George Younghusband and Francis Younghusband
 Eileen Younghusband (1902–1981), British social worker
 Eileen Younghusband (WAAF officer) (1921–2016), British filter officer in the Women's Auxiliary Air Force during World War II
 Colonel Sir Francis Younghusband (1863–1942), British Army officer, explorer, and spiritualist
The 1903–04 Younghusband Expedition to Tibet, which he commanded
 Major General Sir George Younghusband (1859–1944), British Army officer, Keeper of the Jewel House, and author
 James Younghusband (born 1986), English-Filipino football player
 Phil Younghusband (born 1987), English-Filipino football player
 William Younghusband (1819–1863) South Australian pastoralist and politician

Places

Australia
 Hundred of Younghusband, a cadastral unit in South Australia
 Younghusband, South Australia, a small settlement on the Murray River
 Younghusband Peninsula, a peninsula in South Australia

Canada
 Younghusband Ridge, on the border of Alberta and British Columbia, Canada

See also 
 Young Husbands, a 1958 Italian comedy film